Rosellinia pepo is a plant pathogen infecting cacao.

References

External links 
 Index Fungorum
 USDA ARS Fungal Database

Fungal plant pathogens and diseases
Cacao diseases
Xylariales
Fungi described in 1908